Sunil Baliram Gaikwad (born 19 June 1970) is an Indian politician from Bharatiya Janata Party (BJP). He represented Latur, Maharashtra in the 16th Lok Sabha.

Early life and education
Sunil Gaikwad was born to Shri Baliram Gaikwad and his wife Vatsala Gaikwad at Ambulga village of Latur district.

Political career
Gaikwad lost the Latur Lok Sabha seat by around 7000 votes in 2009. He won 2014 Lok Sabha elections from Latur. In 2017, he alleged he was being ill-treated at airports because he shared the same surname as Ravindra Gaikwad, who had assaulted an airline employee. In 2019, BJP replaced him with Sudhakar Shringare.

References

People from Latur district
1970 births
India MPs 2014–2019
Living people
Lok Sabha members from Maharashtra
People from Marathwada
Bharatiya Janata Party politicians from Maharashtra